Erica Gail Klarreich is an American mathematician, journalist and science popularizer.

Early life and education
Klarreich's father was a professor of mathematics, and her mother was a mathematics teacher.

Klarreich obtained her Ph.D. in mathematics under the guidance of Yair Nathan Minsky at Stony Brook University in 1997.

Mathematics
As a mathematician, Klarreich proved that the boundary of the curve complex is homeomorphic to the space of ending laminations.

Popular science writing
As a popular science writer, Klarreich's work has appeared in publications such as Nature, Scientific American, New Scientist, and Quanta Magazine. She is one of the winners of the 2021 Joint Policy Board for Mathematics Communications Award for her popular science writing.

Selected publications

Mathematics
 "The boundary at infinity of the curve complex and the relative Teichmüller space"
 "Semiconjugacies between Kleinian group actions on the Riemann sphere"

Popular science
 "Biologists join the dots", Nature, v. 413, n. 6855, pp. 450–452, 2001.
 "Foams and honeycombs", American Scientist, v. 88, n. 2, pp. 152–161, 2000.
 "Quantum cryptography: Can you keep a secret?", Nature, v. 418, n. 6895, pp. 270–272, 2002.
 "Huygens's clocks revisited", American Scientist, v. 90, pp. 322–323, 2002.

References

External links 
 Klarreich's personal page

Living people
Geometers
20th-century American mathematicians
21st-century American mathematicians
American women mathematicians
Stony Brook University alumni
Place of birth missing (living people)
Science communicators
Quantum cryptography
Mathematical chemistry
20th-century women mathematicians
21st-century women mathematicians
Year of birth missing (living people)
21st-century American women